Yingchunting is a subdistrict of Wugang City in Hunan, China. It was one of four subdistricts approved to establish in 1994. The subdistrict of Yingchunting has 20 villages and 4 communities under its jurisdiction. Its seat is Tuoping Village.

History
The subdistrict of Yingchunting was approved to establish from a part of the former Chengguan Town and three villages of Xindong, Dongta and Fengren of the former Xindong Township in 1994.

Amalgamation of villages in 2016

Subdivisions
Through the amalgamation of villages in 2016, the number of villages was reduced to 20 from 33, the subdistrict of Yingchunting has 4 communities and 22 villages under its jurisdiction.

20 villages
 Baizhushan Village
 Caoqi Village
 Dimuyan Village
 Fengren Village
 Fuxi Village
 Gaochuanling Village
 Hetang Village
 Huangchong Village
 Jinming Village
 Litang Village
 Qiliqiao Village
 Qingshan Village
 Shiyang Village
 Shuangfeng Village
 Shuile Village
 Taiping Village
 Tongbao Village
 Tuoping Village
 Xindong Village
 Xuanyang Village

4 communities
 Dongta Community
 Huata Community
 Wangcheng Community
 Yingchun Community

Subdivisions in 2015
In 2015, Toutang Township() was merged to the subdistrict of Yingchunting, the new subdistrict of Yingchunting had 33 villages and 4 communities under it jurisdiction, of which, 4 communities and 2 villages from the former Yingchunting Subdistrict and 31 villages from the former Toutang Township.

2 villages and 4 communitiesof the former Yingchunting Subdistrict
 Dongta Community
 Huata Community
 Wangcheng Community
 Yingchun Community
 Fengren Village
 Xindong Village

31 villages of the former Toutang Township
 Baixi Village
 Baizhushan Village
 Caoqi Village
 Dajing Village
 Dimuyan Village
 Ertang Village
 Gaochuan Village
 Hehua Village
 Hetang Village
 Huangshachong Village
 Huangtou Village
 Huanle Village
 Jiangkou Village
 Jingfuting Village
 Jinming Village
 Lanma Village
 Laowu Village
 Litang Village
 Longyan Village
 Qiliqiao Village
 Qingshan Village
 Shitouping Village
 Shiyang Village
 Shuangfeng Village
 Shuile Village
 Tongbao Village
 Tuoping Village
 Xiaoshan Village
 Xuanyang Village
 Yongxing Village
 Yueban Village

References

Wugang, Hunan
Subdistricts of Hunan